The South American Championship 1955 was a football tournament held in Chile and won by Argentina with Chile as runners-up. Brazil, Bolivia, and Colombia withdrew from the tournament. Rodolfo Micheli from Argentina became top scorer of the tournament with 8 goals.

Squads

Venues

Final round

Result

Goal scorers

8 Goals
  Rodolfo Micheli

6 Goals

  Enrique Hormazabal
  Gómez Sánchez

5 Goals
  Maximo Rolón

4 Goals
  Manuel Muñoz

3 Goals

  José Borello
  Ángel Labruna
  Jorge Robledo
  René Meléndez
  Isidro Matute 
  Julio Abbadie
  Américo Galván 
  Óscar Míguez

2 Goals

  Ernesto Grillo
  Díaz Zambrano

1 Goal

  Ricardo Bonelli
  Carlos Cecconato
  Ramírez Banda
  Washington Villacreses
  Eulogio Martínez
  Salvador Villalba
  Guillermo Barbadillo 
  Félix Castillo
  Cornelio Heredia 
  Roberto Castillo
  Alberto Terry
  Carlos Borges
  Julio Pérez
  Walter Morel 

Own Goal
  Honorato Gonzabay (2 for Peru)

External links
 South American Championship 1955 at RSSSF

1955
International association football competitions hosted by Chile
1955 in South American football
1955 in Chilean football
February 1955 sports events in South America
March 1955 sports events in South America
Sports competitions in Santiago
1950s in Santiago, Chile